Ljudevit is a Croatian masculine given name. The name comes from the word ljudi, meaning people. The name Ljudevit is also used as a translation of foreign names such as Ludwig or Louis.

Ljudevit may refer to:

 Ljudevit (Lower Pannonia), a medieval duke
 Ljudevit Gaj, Croatian writer and politician
 Ljudevit Grgurić Grga, Croatian TV personality, host of several Croatia in the Eurovision Song Contest events
 Ljudevit Jonke, Croatian linguist
 Ljudevit Jurak, Croatian pathologist
 Ljudevit Tomašić, Croatian politician
 Ljudevit Vukotinović, Croatian politician and writer
 Ljudevit Vuličević, Serbian writer
 Andrija Ljudevit Adamić, Croatian merchant and politician

References

Croatian masculine given names